The 2012–13 Sam Houston State Bearkats men's basketball team represented Sam Houston State University during the 2012–13 NCAA Division I men's basketball season. The Bearkats, led by third year head coach Jason Hooten, played their home games at the Bernard Johnson Coliseum and were members of the Southland Conference. They finished the season 17–17, 8–10 in Southland play to in a tie for fifth place. They advanced to the semifinals of the Southland tournament where they lost to Northwestern State.

Roster

Schedule

|-
!colspan=9| Regular season

|-
!colspan=9| 2013 Southland Conference men's basketball tournament

References

Sam Houston Bearkats men's basketball seasons
Sam Houston State
Sam Houston State Bearkats basketball
Sam Houston State Bearkats basketball